The Redmi Note 7 series refer to a series of smartphones released by Redmi, a sub-brand of Xiaomi. All (except the Redmi Note 7 variant in India) have 48MP + 5MP camera sensors. Most have a Qualcomm Snapdragon 660 SoC, except the Redmi Note 7 Pro, which has a better Qualcomm Snapdragon 675 SoC. The phones support mobile network frequencies in different regions. The Note 7 is available in many local versions and a global version, compatible with mobile phone providers in most places; the Pro model is supplied in slightly different Chinese and Indian versions. The Redmi Note 7S doesn't have much difference when compared to Redmi Note 7 except in case of the rear camera, hence the production of the Redmi Note 7S was discontinued and came under the Redmi Note 7 in India but it's still available separately in China and other countries.

In August 2019 Xiaomi announced that the Redmi Note 7 series had sold more than 20 million units worldwide.

Specifications
The Redmi Note 7 (lavender) is available in versions M1901F7C (for Hong Kong), 1901F7E (for China), 1901F7G (global), and 1901F7H (for Asia).

Design
The Redmi Note 7 (and Note 7 Pro) features a shiny glass back with a gradient that Xiaomi calls "Aura Design". Both the front and back of the device have 2.5D curved Gorilla Glass 5 glass. The phone also has a P2i nano-coating that makes it splash resistant, nevertheless the phone hasn't received an official IP Code. In other markets such as India, available color variants include Nebula Red, Space Black, and Neptune Blue.

The Redmi Note 7 (and Note 7 Pro) also features a dot notch in the display to accommodate the front-facing camera.

Software
The Redmi Note 7 and Pro run on Xiaomi's MIUI version 10, based on Android Pie (9), with minor version updates from time to time. Xiaomi has confirmed that these phones will be upgraded to Android 10; unofficial information suggests that this will be done in the third quarter of 2020. Updates to MIUI 11 (based on Android 9) for the Redmi Note 7 and the Redmi Note 7 Pro were available for download in late 2019, though not yet distributed over the air (OTA) for some ROM versions. From 19 November 2020, MIUI 12 based on Android 10 was being rolled out to Redmi Note 7/7s, with distribution to other phones after beta testing.

Hardware
The Redmi Note 7 (lavender) and Note 7 Pro (violet), both have a 6.3-inch Full HD+ (2340x1080 pixels) display with a 19.5:9 aspect ratio. The Redmi Note 7 is powered by a 14 nm octa-core Snapdragon 660 SoC while the Note 7 Pro houses a Snapdragon 675 SoC, making it the first Xiaomi device to use the chip. The RN7 has an Adreno 512 GPU (612 for the Pro variant) and a 4000 mAh battery and supports Quick Charge 4. Various versions are fitted with 3, 4, or 6 GB of RAM, with 32, 64, or 128 GB of storage; a micro SD card of up to 256 GB is supported via a hybrid SIM card slot. The Pro version's camera has a Sony IMX586 sensor with f/1.8 aperture, slightly better than the RN7's similarly specified Samsung ISOCELL GM1 sensor; both have a secondary 5-megapixel depth sensor. The front camera has a resolution of 13 megapixels. The rear camera can record 4K video at 30fps.

The RN7 Pro has a studio lighting mode live option, showing what the studio lighting effect will look like.

The phone has AI scene detection capable of recognizing up to 12 scenes, AI Portrait 2.0 and a Night Mode.

Connectivity
The Redmi Note 7 (and Note 7 Pro) supports Wi-Fi 802.11 a/b/g/n/ac, satellite navigation, Bluetooth v5.0, USB OTG, USB Type-C, 3G and 4G networks (with support for Band 40 used by some LTE networks in India), and VoLTE.

Other features
The phone has a gyroscope, proximity sensor, and fingerprint sensor. It has two Nano-SIM slots; one of them is a hybrid, capable of holding either a SIM or a microSD card. Either slot can, if equipped with a SIM, can be configured as the primary one.

An IR blaster, emulating an infrared remote control, and a 3.5mm headphone jack are fitted.

Release
The Chinese version of Redmi Note 7 was launched in Beijing on 15 January 2019.

The Indian versions of Redmi Note 7 and Redmi Note 7 Pro were launched together in New Delhi, India on 28 February 2019.

The Global version of Redmi Note 7 was launched on 6 March 2019.

The Chinese version of Redmi Note 7 Pro was launched on 18 March 2019.

There will not be a global version of the Redmi Note 7 Pro.

The Indian version of Redmi Note 7S was launched on 20 May 2019.

Rear camera images

References

External links
 Official site (global version)
 Specifications from GSM Arena

Phablets
Redmi smartphones
Mobile phones introduced in 2019
Mobile phones with multiple rear cameras
Mobile phones with 4K video recording
Mobile phones with infrared transmitter
Discontinued smartphones